Sumarian is a misspelling and may refer to:
Sumerian
Samaria or Samaritans